Clarence Joseph Veniot (February 9, 1886 – March 7, 1977) was a physician, surgeon and political figure in New Brunswick, Canada. He represented Gloucester in the House of Commons of Canada from 1936 to 1945 as a Liberal member and then served in the Senate of Canada representing Gloucester division from 1945 to 1966.

He was born in Moncton, New Brunswick, the son of former Premier of New Brunswick Peter Veniot and his wife, Catherine Melanson.

Clarence Veniot served as mayor of Bathurst from 1933 to 1935. He was first elected by acclamation to the House of Commons in a 1936 by-election held after his father's death.

Electoral record

References 

1886 births
1977 deaths
Members of the House of Commons of Canada from New Brunswick
Liberal Party of Canada MPs
Canadian senators from New Brunswick
Mayors of Bathurst, New Brunswick
People from Moncton